Jeff Howard is an American football coach who currently serves as the Linebackers coach for the Los Angeles Chargers.

Playing career

Howard played linebacker for Eastern New Mexico from 2001-2004 and was a 4-time Academic All-Lone Star Conference member. Howard earned 1st Team All-Lone Star Conference honors as a linebacker (LB) in 2003-2004  while capping his career by being named a 2004 AFCA Division II All-American and graduating cum laude with a degree in biology and chemistry. Howard had his jersey retired by Eastern New Mexico in 2006 and entered ENMU Hall of Honor in 2011.

Coaching career

Early coaching career
Howard transitioned from his on-field playing days to coaching at Odessa Permian High School in Odessa, Texas. Howard was on staff from 2007–2010, during which he assisted the defensive backs and LBs before becoming the defensive coordinator in 2009–2010. Howard was on the Texas Tech staff from 2011–2012, he started in the summer of 2011 as an offensive assistant working with the offensive line position then moving to the defensive side of the ball to serve in the defensive quality control role for the 2011 season and coaching the safety position in 2012.

Minnesota Vikings

Howard joined the Minnesota Vikings for the  NFL season as assistant to the head coach, Brad Childress.

Cleveland Browns
On January 29, 2020, the Cleveland Browns announced that Howard would be joining their team under Head Coach Kevin Stefanski as the team's defensive backs coach and pass game coordinator. Howard missed the team's wild card playoff game against the Pittsburgh Steelers on January 10, 2021, due to COVID-19 protocols.

References

External links
 
 Jeff Howard Bio on Pro Football History

Living people
1983 births
American football linebackers
Cleveland Browns coaches
Eastern New Mexico Greyhounds football players
High school football coaches in Texas
Minnesota Vikings coaches
Texas Tech Red Raiders football coaches